Patricia Mota (born 1982) is an actress and film producer of Dominican Republic descent, She played a lead role in the critically acclaimed film GI Jesús that premiered at the "Grauman's Egyptian Theatre", on January 23, 2007, with Cineville. GI Jesús took the Grand Jury Prize at CineVegas 06 film festival. She was also in the film State Property 2 with Lions Gate.

Career
Mota is now CEO for Mota Studios LLC, Mota Studios is an artist community with a point of view, a group of artists with a voice and a vision.

Mota is a painter, photographer, co-producer. She was born in the Dominican Republic, moving to the US at age 12, and has a daughter, Preciosa Mota. Half of her life she lived in North America in between New York, Miami & California. She is the sister of supermodel & actress Omahyra Mota.

Awards
She was nominated as the best actress in the Baja California film fest 2007 for the film GI Jesus.

Filmography
Producer:
The Land of the Astronauts (2007) (pre-production) (associate producer) .
G.I. Jesus (2006) (co-producer) .

References

External links

1982 births
Living people
American film producers
American film actresses
21st-century American painters
American people of Dominican Republic descent
American women painters
21st-century American women artists
American women film producers